Raja Bahadur Venkatarama Reddy Education Society Boys Hostel popularly known as Reddy Hostel is an independent boys hostel located in Hyderabad, Telangana. It was established in 1914 by philanthropist, Raja Bahadur Venkatarama Reddy. It was the first hostel established in Hyderabad State for non-local students.

History
The hostel was started in the year 1914 during the reign of last Nizam of Hyderabad State, Mir Osman Ali Khan by Raja Bahadur Venakta Rama Reddy, a civil servant and philanthropist. Reddy Hostel library has a collection of old and new books.

Popular Alumni
 P V Narasimha Rao - Former Prime Minister of India
 Raavi Narayan Reddy - A revolutionary activist

References

External links
 Official site

Hyderabad State